Peter Hamel (1911–1979) was a German screenwriter and a director of film and television. He appeared as himself in the 1948 comedy Film Without a Title. He is the father of the composer Peter Michael Hamel.

Selected filmography
 Film Without a Title (1948)
 Artists' Blood (1949)
 Oh, You Dear Fridolin (1952)
 The Daring Swimmer (1957)

References

Bibliography
 Baer, Hester. Dismantling the Dream Factory: Gender, German Cinema, and the Postwar Quest for a New Film Language. Berghahn Books, 2012.

External links

1911 births
1979 deaths
Mass media people from Mannheim